Aadhi Raat is Bollywood Hindi film of 1950, directed by S. K. Ojha and starring Ashok Kumar, Nargis, Jeevan, Cuckoo, Kuldip Kaur, Neelam and Tiwari. The music was composed by Husnlal Bhagatram, while Geeta Dutt, Lata Mangeshkar and Meena Kapoor were the playback singers.

Cast
Ashok Kumar
Nargis
Jeevan
Kuldip Kaur
Cuckoo Moray
Neelam
Ramayan Tiwari

Soundtrack
"Hume Duniya ko Dil ke jakhm" - Lata Mangeshkar, Mohammed Rafi
"Maine Balam Se" - Geeta Dutt, Meena Kapoor
"Rona Hi Likja Tha" - Lata Mangeshkar
"Dil Hi To Hai" - Lata Mangeshkar
"Idhar To Aao" - Lata Mangeshkar
"Banke Suhagan" - Lata Mangeshkar
"Dil Zakhmon Se Chu" - Mohammed Rafi, Geeta Dutt
"Aayi Suhani Raat" - Lata Mangeshkar
"Lo Jawani Ka Zamana" - Meena Kapoor

References

External links 
 

1950 films
1950s Hindi-language films
Films scored by Husnlal Bhagatram
Indian romantic drama films
1950 romantic drama films
Indian black-and-white films